Philip N. Remler is the former Head of the Organization for Security and Co-operation in Europe (OSCE) Mission to Moldova.

Biography

Philip N. Remler served as Head of the OSCE Mission to Moldova from December 2007 to January 2012, after a career as a Foreign Service Officer with the United States Department of State. Prior to his appointment to the OSCE, he served as Senior Advisor to the U.S. Ambassador in Moscow.

Remler joined the United States Department of State in 1983. Earlier in his career he served in Turkey, the USSR and Azerbaijan. Other postings include positions in the State Department and the National Security Council on Iraq and at the U.S. Embassy to Georgia. He worked closely with the OSCE Minsk Group on resolving the Nagorno-Karabakh conflict when he served as Deputy Head of the State Department Office of the Special Negotiator for Regional Conflicts.

References

External links 
 Philip Remler 
 OSCE Mission to Moldova 
 Head of OSCE Mission to Moldova Philip N. Remler arriving in Ukraine for two-day working visit today

American diplomats
Living people
Year of birth missing (living people)